Megan Kathleen Hilty (born March 29, 1981) is an American actress and singer. She rose to prominence for her roles in Broadway musicals, including her performance as Glinda the Good Witch in Wicked, Doralee Rhodes in 9 to 5: The Musical, and her Tony Award–nominated role as Brooke Ashton in Noises Off. She also starred as Ivy Lynn on the musical-drama series Smash, on which she sang the Grammy Award-nominated "Let Me Be Your Star", and portrayed Liz on the sitcom Sean Saves the World.

Early life
Hilty was born in Bellevue, Washington, the daughter of Donna and Jack Hilty. She began taking vocal lessons at the age of 12 and was interested in performing opera. She attended Sammamish High School in Bellevue then transferred to the Washington Academy of Performing Arts Conservatory High School in Redmond, and later attended the Chrysalis School in Woodinville.

Hilty graduated from the Carnegie Mellon School of Drama in 2004 and is a member of the Actors' Equity Association. She is a recipient of the National Society of Arts and Letters Award for Excellence in Musical Theater.

Career

Shortly before graduating from Carnegie Mellon University, Hilty auditioned for the musical Wicked. She moved to New York City after graduating and, in August 2004, made her Broadway debut as the standby for Glinda the Good Witch before taking over the role from Jennifer Laura Thompson on May 31, 2005. After playing the role for a year, Hilty ended her run on May 28, 2006, and was succeeded by Kate Reinders. She then reprised the role on the first national tour of the show from September through December 2006, replacing Kendra Kassebaum. Soon after, Hilty originated the role in the Los Angeles sit-down production, which began previews on February 10, 2007, and opened on February 21. She left the production on May 18, 2008, and was replaced by Erin Mackey, only to return on October 31, 2008, to close the production, which played its final performance on January 11, 2009.

Hilty starred in the musical Vanities during its premiere engagement at the Mountain View Center for the Performing Arts in Mountain View, California. In addition to her stage work, Hilty has made guest appearances on television shows including The Closer, The Suite Life of Zack & Cody, Ugly Betty, CSI: Crime Scene Investigation, Desperate Housewives, and Shark. She was the singing voice of Snow White in the animated feature film Shrek the Third.

In 2008, Hilty joined Allison Janney, Stephanie J. Block, and Marc Kudisch in the musical adaptation of the 1980 film 9 to 5. The production was directed by Joe Mantello, with a pre-Broadway run at the Ahmanson Theatre in Los Angeles, which opened on September 9, 2008. Hilty had participated in workshops and readings as the character Doralee Rhodes (the character Dolly Parton had played in the film version). The musical began preview performances on Broadway at the Marquis Theatre on April 7, 2009, with an official opening on April 30, 2009, closing on September 6, 2009. For this role, Hilty was nominated for the Outer Critics Circle Award for Outstanding Actress in a Musical, the Drama League Award for Distinguished Performance, and the Drama Desk Award for Outstanding Actress in a Musical.

In 2009, Hilty appeared in an episode of CSI: Crime Scene Investigation entitled "Deep Fried and Minty Fresh", playing a fast food manager helping out with a murder at Choozy's Chicken. She also appeared in two episodes of Desperate Housewives as the other woman to Carlos' boss. Hilty also lent her talents in Rated RSO: The Music and Lyrics of Ryan Scott Oliver at the Boston Court Performing Arts Center in December 2009, alongside Lesli Margherita, Steve Kazee, Morgan Karr, Natalie Weiss, and others. Hilty also branched off into a coffee and tea product line. In 2010, Hilty confirmed that she would voice the character of the China Princess in the animated film Dorothy of Oz. In 2011, it was announced that she was cast in the NBC musical-drama series Smash, opposite Debra Messing, Anjelica Huston, and Brian d'Arcy James. The series premiered on February 6, 2012, and aired for two seasons.

In May 2012, Hilty appeared in Gentlemen Prefer Blondes as a part of the Encores! staged concert series. She appeared as Lorelei Lee alongside Brennan Brown, Simon Jones, and Rachel York. Hilty received rave reviews for her performance, with The New York Times rating her performance on par with those of Carol Channing and Marilyn Monroe.

In November 2012, it was announced that Hilty would appear on the album I'm Ready: The Songs of Rob Rokicki. Hilty released her debut solo album, It Happens All the Time, on March 12, 2013. On June 13, 2013, it was announced that Hilty would star alongside Sean Hayes in the NBC sitcom Sean Saves the World. The series was cancelled on January 28, 2014, after airing 13 episodes.

In July 2015, it was reported that Hilty would return to Broadway in the Roundabout Theatre Company's revival of Noises Off, portraying Brooke Ashton. For her performance, Hilty received nominations for the Tony Award for Best Featured Actress in a Play, the Drama Desk Award for Outstanding Featured Actress in a Play, and the Drama League Award for Distinguished Performance. That same year, she recurred as Charlene on Girlfriends' Guide to Divorce. On July 7, 2016, Hilty appeared alongside Matthew Morrison for an evening with The New York Pops at the Forest Hills Stadium in Queens.

In November 2021, it was announced that Hilty would be playing Lily St. Regis in NBC's Annie Live!, replacing Jane Krakowski who withdrew from the show after a getting breakthrough case of COVID-19.

Personal life
Hilty was in a relationship with actor Steve Kazee from 2005 until 2012. On November 2, 2013, Hilty married actor Brian Gallagher in Las Vegas, Nevada. In March 2014, she announced that she was expecting their first child. Hilty gave birth to a girl, Viola Philomena Gallagher, on September 18, 2014. On September 24, 2016, she announced that she was pregnant with her second child. Their son, Ronan Laine Gallagher, was born on March 13, 2017.

On September 4, 2022, Hilty's sister Lauren, brother-in-law Ross Mickel, and nephew Remy were killed in a floatplane crash into Puget Sound off the coast of Whidbey Island. Lauren Hilty-Mickel was eight months pregnant at the time of her death.

Stage

Filmography

Film

Television

Awards and nominations

References

External links

 
 
 
  (archive)
 Playbill article on Wicked

1981 births
21st-century American actresses
Actresses from Washington (state)
American musical theatre actresses
American sopranos
American stage actresses
American television actresses
American voice actresses
Carnegie Mellon University College of Fine Arts alumni
Living people
People from Bellevue, Washington
21st-century American women singers
21st-century American singers